Giuseppe Perrino (3 January 1992 – 2 June 2021) was an Italian footballer who played as a midfielder.

Career
Perrino joined Parma from Ebolitana in the summer of 2012 and immediately moved to Bellaria Igea Marina on loan.

He died of a heart attack on 2 June 2021, while playing in a match in honour of his brother, Rocco, who had died from a heart attack three years earlier.

References

External links
 

1992 births
2021 deaths
Italian footballers
Association football defenders
Parma Calcio 1913 players
S.S. Ebolitana 1925 players
Association football players who died while playing
Sport deaths in Italy